The canton of Cognac-1 is an administrative division of the Charente department, southwestern France. It was created at the French canton reorganisation which came into effect in March 2015. Its seat is in Cognac.

It consists of the following communes:
 
Boutiers-Saint-Trojan
Bréville
Cherves-Richemont
Cognac (partly)
Louzac-Saint-André
Mesnac
Saint-Brice
Saint-Sulpice-de-Cognac

References

Cantons of Charente